This table displays the top-rated primetime television series of the 2009–10 season as measured by Nielsen Media Research.

References

2009 in American television
2010 in American television
2009-related lists
2010-related lists
Lists of American television series